Gideon Nye (1812January25, 1888) was an American diplomat, art collector, writer and merchant in the East Indian and China trade, known both for his art collection and for his books on China.

He was born in North Fairhaven, MA (now Acushnet) in 1812.

Career
Nye went to China in 1831, where he worked for various companies in the East Indian and Chinese trade. In 1843 he opened the House of Nye, Parkin & Co. In 1851 the firm name changed its name to Nye Brothers & Co. and operated until 1856. In this time period, it was also known as Bull, Nye, & Co. due to the brief involvement of Isaac Bull. Nye Brothers suffered a collapse in 1856 after over-investing during a down market.

Family

Gideon Nye, known as Gideon Nye, Jr., was a 7th generation descendant of Benjamin Nye, the founder of the Nye family, who settled in Sandwich, Mass., in 1637. He was an eldest child. His father, Gideon Nye, was born in 1786 and died in 1875. His mother, Sylvia S. Hathaway, was born in 1790, and died in 1883. Mr Nye was married in 1846, to Mary E. Washburn, who died in New York in 1870. Their only child was a daughter, born in Paris, France in 1846, Ellen E. Washburn. She died in Brooklyn, NY, in 1860.

Residence in Canton 
Nye was a merchant in China for over fifty years and the American Vice Consul at Canton (now Guangzhou) for the last ten years of his life. He was a scholarly man with a reputation for integrity, active as a Vice President of the Medical Missionary Society, and as a corresponding member of the American Geographical Society. He was known as one of the oldest foreign residents of Canton, having spent 55 years in that city since his arrival in 1831. He died in the city on January25, 1888 and afterwards "the flags of the consulates, custom house and foreign ships in port were at half mast two days in token of public esteem and sorrow."

Art collection 
Nye purchased a large collection of valuable paintings in England between 18451850, which were exhibited in New York. Attempts were made to keep his collection intact, but it was dispersed to locations such as the Metropolitan Museum of Art. The paintings were considered important American artistic treasures of the time.

Books and writings on the Opium Wars
Nye published many books and pamphlets as an eye witness to the events which led up to the First Opium War, based on his acquaintance with both Chinese people and foreigners living in China.

References

Bibliography

External links
Catalogue of the pictures of Nye's collection
 Nye and Formosa, passage from Americans in Eastern Asia
Court case involving Nye Bros. & Co, tea, 1859

American merchants
American art collectors
19th-century American diplomats
American consuls
American expatriates in China
Businesspeople from Guangzhou
China Hands
History of foreign trade in China
Businesspeople from Massachusetts
1888 deaths
1812 births
People from Fairhaven, Massachusetts